Mercy Park is a 16-acre park in Joplin, Missouri, built on land donated by Mercy Hospital Joplin. It was created as a result of the recovery efforts following the May 2011 tornado on what was the hospital's original site. It sits adjacent to the new Mercy Chapel Park and reconstructed Cunningham Park; the area is known as "ground zero" for the tornado touchdown and heaviest of storm damage. 

The park holds restrooms, two shelters, picnic tables, a pond and fountain, a mural, and some trails. A sculpture walk was incorporated in 2018 as part of a private community-driven fundraising effort. The park was funded as part of a large Federal Community Development Block Grant awarded to the city after the disaster.

References

Joplin, Missouri